Daytime television is the general term for television programs produced for broadcast during the daytime hours on weekdays; programs broadcast in the daypart historically (though not necessarily exclusively) have been programmed to appeal to a female audience.

In the United States, the daytime slot follows the early morning daypart (typically dedicated mainly to local and network morning shows), usually running Monday through Friday from 10:00 a.m. to 4:30 p.m. local time. (A broader definition of the daypart includes the designated "early morning," "early access" and "prime access" dayparts as well as weekends, encompassing programs aired between 6:00 a.m. and 8:00 p.m. ET/PT; under the alternate definition, daytime programming ends one hour early outside of the Eastern and Pacific Time Zones due to regional adjustments to the start of network prime time schedules.)

This article focuses on television programs and genres common in American daytime television, primarily focusing on programs typically shown on national over-the-air television networks and in syndication.

Types of daytime programming
There are several different genres or formats of daytime programming that are produced. Most of these shows can be produced on a low budget, as these shows have to be able to make at least five new episodes per week (sometimes more) for most of the year. Most daytime shows are syndicated, meaning local stations buy the rights to air them.

Daytime commercials
Commercials aired during weekday daytime programming mostly advertise food & drink, household goods, feminine products, and baby/child care products that target housewives and stay-at-home moms, who make up the largest portion of the daytime viewing audience. Public service announcements are also usually aired during daytime hours. Additionally, commercials tend to target retired persons through advertisement of such products as timeshare and retirement insurance, such as those available through AARP.  During the 1980s, an entire series of diabetes testing supply commercials were produced for daytime television by Liberty Medical, which became well known due to their spokesman Wilfred Brimley and his often direct and gruff nature when addressing the audience.

Commercials aired during weekend daytime programming, especially during sports programming, target mostly (though not exclusively) male audiences. Such commercials advertise beer and other alcoholic beverages, men's hygiene (especially shaving products), new vehicles, auto parts and auto maintenance facility chains, personal and corporate business, airlines, luxury hotels, and upscale restaurants and pubs.

Court shows
There are currently many different court shows produced in United States daytime television. Most of these shows usually deal with one, sometimes two small claims court cases per episode. Other shows deal with family law or reenactments of more serious cases. The cases are typically a form of binding arbitration between two litigating parties who agree to drop their conventional lawsuit to appear on television; they are not scripted, the participants are not actors, and decisions are handed down by real judges or attorneys. All of the following court shows are syndicated. Court shows usually occupy the morning and late-afternoon time slots.

Current U.S. daytime court shows
 America's Court with Judge Ross  
 Divorce Court 
 Hot Bench   
 Judge Mathis 
 Justice for All with Judge Cristina Perez
 Justice with Judge Mablean 
 The People's Court
 Relative Justice with Rhonda Willis 
 Supreme Justice with Judge Karen
 The Verdict with Judge Hatchett
 We the People with Judge Lauren Lake

Soap operas
A staple of daytime television since the 1950s, soap operas continue to be among the most popular programs among daytime audiences. Soap operas are dramatic serials that tell ongoing stories of the day-to-day lives of large casts of characters, each still having its own identity. The term "soap opera" is somewhat of a misnomer, dating to the early days of radio and television when purveyors of detergents and soaps such as Procter & Gamble, Colgate-Palmolive and Unilever generally sponsored, financed and produced these shows individually. Soap operas usually occupy the afternoon time slots in daytime programming (especially from 1 p.m. to 4 p.m. local time).

Current U.S. soap operas
Broadcast 
The Bold and the Beautiful (CBS; 1987–)
General Hospital (ABC; 1963–)
The Young and the Restless (CBS; 1973–)

Streaming
Days of Our Lives (NBC; 1965–2022, Peacock; 2022–)

Retired
All My Children (ABC/The Online Network; 1970–2011, 2013)
Another World (NBC; 1964–1999)
As the World Turns (CBS; 1956–2010)
The City (ABC; 1995–1997)
Dark Shadows (ABC; 1966-1971)
The Edge of Night (CBS/ABC; 1956–1975, 1975–1984)
Guiding Light (CBS; 1952–2009)
Love of Life (CBS; 1951–1980)
Loving (ABC; 1983–1995)
One Life to Live (ABC/The Online Network; 1968–2012, 2013)
Passions (NBC/The 101; 1999–2007, 2007–2008)
Port Charles (ABC; 1997–2003)
Ryan's Hope (ABC; 1975–1989)
Santa Barbara (NBC; 1984–1993)
Search for Tomorrow (CBS/NBC; 1951–1982, 1982–1986)
The Secret Storm (CBS; 1954–1974)
Somerset (NBC; 1970-1976)
Sunset Beach (NBC; 1997–1999)

Game shows
Game shows, another long-time mainstay of daytime television, involve real people playing a game, or a series of games, as contestants like the title suggests, with the ultimate goal of winning a prize (usually a large amount of money or an expensive luxury item, such as a new car or a trip).

The period from 1972 to 1985 could be considered the "Golden Age of Game Shows," as all three of the major broadcast networks carried several game shows during their daytime lineups, usually occupying the mid/late-morning and late-afternoon time slots. ABC Daytime ended their block in 1985 (with occasional stand-alone game shows such as Bargain Hunters in 1987 and Match Game in 1990 airing in the years that followed) followed by NBC Daytime in 1991 (with a brief revival in 1993) and CBS Daytime in 1993.  CBS still carries two daytime game shows, the long-running The Price Is Right and a revival of Let's Make a Deal. CBS currently allows both daytime game shows to be arranged as a two-hour block by affiliates (10AM ET) if preferred instead of bookending the schedule (11 AM and 3 PM ET).

Of the current daytime game shows, The Price Is Right began as part of CBS's daytime game show block in 1972 and is the only show to have aired continuously on daytime network television since the end of that era. Family Feud, Jeopardy! and Wheel of Fortune (the latter two of which usually airs during the fringe time hour, but are also occasionally scheduled in the daytime, especially in the Central Time Zone and in markets where Jeopardy! airs two episodes a day) have all transitioned from network daytime shows to syndication, while Who Wants to Be a Millionaire (which ended in 2019 after a total of 20 seasons) was a network prime time program that transitioned to syndication, then transitioned back to network prime time in 2020. Both current CBS Daytime game shows began as 30-minute game shows that transitioned into one-hour formats (Price in 1975 and Deal in 2009).

Current game shows
Network

Weekdays
Let's Make a Deal (CBS; 2009–, aired in various forms on NBC, ABC and syndication from 1963 to 1981, 1984 to 1986, 1990, and 2003)
The Price Is Right (CBS; 1972–, aired on NBC from 1956 to 1963 and ABC from 1963 to 1965)

Primetime
The $100,000 Pyramid – originally aired on CBS and ABC from 1973 to 1981 as The $10,000/$20,000 Pyramid; aired on CBS from 1982 to 1988 as The (New) $25,000 Pyramid; primetime revival began airing on ABC in 2016
Press Your Luck – originally aired on CBS from 1983 to 1986; primetime revival began airing on ABC in 2019
To Tell the Truth – originally aired on CBS from 1956 to 1968, then on NBC from 1990 to 1991; primetime revival began airing on ABC in 2016

Syndicated
Family Feud - syndicated by Debmar-Mercury; formerly aired on ABC from 1976 to 1985 and on CBS from 1988 to 1993
Funny You Should Ask - syndicated by Entertainment Studios
Jeopardy! - syndicated by CBS Media Ventures; formerly aired on NBC from 1964 to 1975 and from 1978 to 1979
Pictionary - syndicated by CBS Media Ventures; formerly aired in syndication in 1989 and from 1997 to 1998
25 Words or Less - syndicated by Fox First Run
Wheel of Fortune - syndicated by CBS Media Ventures; formerly aired on NBC from 1975 to 1989 and on CBS from 1989 to 1991; moved back to NBC in 1991
You Bet Your Life - syndicated by Fox First Run; formerly aired on NBC from 1950 to 1961 and in syndication from 1980 to 1981 and 1992 to 1993

Morning news programs

These network news programs provide more in-depth coverage of news and current events that are broadcast on the evening news. These programs may also cover life-improvement tips; such as healthy dieting and exercise, do-it-yourself household projects, and other advice and tips to enhance one's well-being. They may also include celebrity guests and concert performances by popular music acts. Most morning shows follow a particular format with hard news and interviews with newsmakers and correspondents in the first half-hour, true crime stories in the second, and lighter fare such as celebrity and lifestyle stories in the second hour (with the concert, if any, closing out the show in the last half-hour). Morning news programs usually occupy the 6:00 to 8:00a.m. or the 7:00 to 9:00a.m. time slot.

Current morning news programs
Good Morning America (ABC; 1975–)
The Today Show (NBC; 1952–)
CBS Mornings (CBS; 2021–)

Most local network affiliates also air their own local morning news programs prior to network programming.

Newsmagazines
Half-hour newsmagazines generally focus on sensationalist tabloid-style news and entertainment coverage. Originally, the tone was light in nature, focusing on notable, non-scandalous events involving celebrities. But market forces and ratings concerns eventually forced programs into a tabloid format, covering such topics as celebrity scandals and major crime events that make national headlines. These programs usually air during the late-afternoon or fringe time hour.

Current newsmagazine shows
Weekdays
Access Hollywood - syndicated by NBCUniversal Syndication Studios
Dish Nation - syndicated by Fox First Run
Entertainment Tonight - syndicated by CBS Media Ventures
Extra - syndicated by Telepictures/Warner Bros. Domestic Television Distribution
Inside Edition - syndicated by CBS Media Ventures
TMZ - syndicated by Fox First Run (formally Telepictures/Warner Bros. Domestic Television Distribution)

Retired newsmagazine shows include PM Magazine (from the 1980s), Hard Copy and A Current Affair (both from the 1990s), and The Insider (from the 2000s). A Current Affair attempted a comeback in the mid-2000s, but was later canceled due to low ratings.

Sunday morning news programs

On Sundays, most networks devote at least part of their Sunday morning schedule to news and political discussion programming. These programs review news events that occurred in the previous week and cover events expected to make national headlines in the coming week.

Current Sunday morning news and public affairs programs
Face the Nation (CBS)
Fox News Sunday (Fox)
Meet the Press (NBC)
This Week (ABC)

Talk shows

In the early years NBC and ABC added daytime talk shows during late morning and afternoon hours. In the years that followed with daytime soap operas fill the daytime slots, talk shows become limited and some of which has since moved into syndication during the 1970s. In recent years, CBS added talk shows for the first time as a replacement for cancelled soap operas, most notably As the World Turns. This makes ABC the only network to air 2 talk shows having aired continuously since the 1950s. Talk shows typically last one hour, and are more often than not hosted by celebrities. Talk shows deal with a variety of topics, like educational or self-help related subjects; to variety shows featuring celebrity interviews, comedic monologues, and stage performances; to tabloid talk shows. Talk shows usually occupy the morning and late-afternoon hours. Syndicated talk shows on the other hand have made a comeback in recent years to 12 talk shows, however it might will decrease to 11 if any new talk shows will be added.

Current U.S. daytime talk shows
Network
GMA3: What You Need To Know  (ABC)
NBC News Daily (NBC)
The Talk (CBS)
The 3rd (NBC)
Today with Hoda & Jenna (NBC)
The View (ABC)

Syndicated
Access Daily with Mario & Kit - NBCUniversal Syndication Studios
Dr. Phil - CBS Media Ventures
The Drew Barrymore Show - CBS Media Ventures
The Jennifer Hudson Show - Warner Bros. Television Distribution
Karamo  - NBCUniversal Syndication Studios
The Kelly Clarkson Show - NBCUniversal Syndication Studios
Live with Kelly and Ryan - Disney-ABC Domestic Television
Rachael Ray - CBS Media Ventures
 Sherri - Debmar-Mercury
The Steve Wilkos Show - NBCUniversal Syndication Studios
Tamron Hall - Disney-ABC Domestic Television
TMZ Live - Warner Bros. Television Distribution

Notable past daytime talk shows

The Phil Donahue Show (1970-1996) was one of the first major hit daytime talk shows and dominated the format up until the mid-1980s, when it was surpassed by The Oprah Winfrey Show (1986-2011), which in turn was the highest-rated talk show on television for most of its run, except for a period in the late 1990s when The Jerry Springer Show (1991-2018) surpassed Oprah.

A number of daytime talk shows that followed a format more closely resembling the late-night talk show have aired over the course of history, including The Mike Douglas Show and Dinah! in the 1970s, and shows such as The Rosie O'Donnell Show, The Howie Mandel Show, The Martin Short Show and The Ellen DeGeneres Show in the late 1990s and early 2000s.

Off-network syndicated programming
Syndication is the practice of selling rights to the presentation of television programs, especially to more than one customer such as a television station, a cable channel, or a programming service such as a national broadcasting system. The syndication of television programs is a fundamental financial component of television industries. Long a crucial factor in the economics of the U.S. industry, syndication is now a worldwide activity involving the sales of programming produced in many countries. While most of the series currently in syndication are either still in production or have only recently ended their runs, the most popular series can command syndication runs lasting decades beyond the end of their production.  Off-network syndicated series also normally occupy the mid/late morning and late-afternoon time slots.

Networks have also been known to rerun scripted programming in daytime, though much less so with the proliferation of syndication, cable television and satellite television in the 1980s and 1990s. The last time a network is known to have done this is when CBS aired reruns of Designing Women from 1991-1992. However, it wasn't until 14 years later in 2006 When Daytime WB aired reruns of Reba along with previous shows such as ER since 2009 no major TV networks has aired any reruns on the daytime slot.

Note that the series listed below are not necessarily restricted to daytime and can air in any open time slot.

Off-network series currently in syndication
Broadcast
American Housewife
The Big Bang Theory
Black-ish
Bob's Burgers
Chicago Fire
Chicago P.D.DatelineFamily GuyFriendsThe GoldbergsThe King of QueensLast Man StandingLaw & Order: Special Victims UnitModern FamilyMomThe NeighborhoodSeinfeldThe SimpsonsTwo and a Half MenYoung SheldonCableImpractical JokersPawn StarsStorage WarsChildren's programs
Long before Nickelodeon and other youth-oriented cable channels launched, children's programs were also part of network and syndicated television's daytime programming lineup. These programs specialized in entertainment and education for preschool and children of elementary school age and mostly occupied morning time slots as well as after-school hours (4:00pm – 6:00pm ET). Captain Kangaroo, which aired on CBS from 1955 to 1984, was one of television's longest-running and most popular program of the genre; while Romper Room was a staple in syndication. PBS also aired various children's programs; among its most popular being Sesame Street, The Electric Company, and Mister Rogers' Neighborhood. Local stations also occasionally aired classic cartoons along with classic reruns of The Mickey Mouse Club and Our Gang comedy shorts (billed as "The Little Rascals"); as well as youth-oriented sitcoms such as Happy Days, What's Happening!!, and Saved By The Bell.

From the 1970s through the 1990s, ABC and CBS aired weekly specials for teenagers and pre-adolescents: ABC Afterschool Special and CBS Schoolbreak Special, which aired once a week during after-school hours in the academic school year, pre-empting their affiliate stations' regularly scheduled programming on that day. Some stories in these specials were light in nature, while other stories focused on more serious teen issues; such as teen pregnancy, drug/alcohol abuse, runaways, bullying, and family issues.

Daytime programming breakdownSee also Dayparting''

The following table shows the general breakdown of the American daytime television schedule; although it may vary depending on time zone, region, networks and local stations.

See also
List of US daytime soap opera ratings
Dayparting
Prime-time television
Graveyard slot
Fringe time

References

Lists of American television series
Television genres
American television-related lists